Collegium Vocale may refer to:
 Collegium Vocale, nonprofit community chorus based in Atlanta, Georgia, United States.
 Collegium Vocale Bydgoszcz, early music vocal ensemble based in Bydgoszcz, Poland
 Collegium Vocale Gent, early music choir based in Ghent, Belgium
 Collegium Vocale Köln, vocal ensemble based in Köln, Germany